Dean De Benedictis is an American composer, musician, performer, and producer of experimental and alternative music. He is a trained musician and has released albums as a solo artist as well as played with groups such as Brand X and The Strato Ensemble.

De Benedictis has recorded under his own name and under the alias "Surface 10", a project in which he gained attention in ambient and experimental electronic music circles. His discography crosses over several genres, but he is primarily known for merging these genres into techno tribal and ambient music. De Benedictis is the founder of both Fateless Records, and the Fateless Flows Collective, a Los Angeles group of electronic composers. He has released three albums with the Fateless Flows Collective through the Fateless Music label.

De Benedictis is the co-founder and producer of Cyberstock, an outdoor music concert and visual arts display held in the Santa Monica Mountains. In its long history, the event has showcased such artists as Nels Cline, Thomas Ronkin, and Richard Derrick.

Early musical career
De Benedictis was educated in Southern California.  He is the son of theater and television composer Richard DeBenedictis.  His first influences included Pink Floyd, Led Zeppelin, Kraftwerk and Soulsonic Force.  Later, he found influence in the progressive jazz fusion, and the Berlin School ambient music genres.  When De Benedictis was barely out of high school, he began scoring and composing television source music for several years.  Here, he created music in a wide variety of pop styles.  At the same time, he was experimenting with electronic music on the side.  In his early career, he moved through many jazz fusion and progressive rock bands.  In 1996, De Benedictis released his debut ambient electronic music CD on Hypnotic/Cleopatra Records. It had a borderline space rock sound.  Early on, he was inspired by such artists as Tangerine Dream and Mark Isham but he has since recorded in several other styles.  In A Lone Reply (Fateless, 2001), he produced a more tribal sound, and credited artists such as Steve Roach, Robert Rich, and Loren Nerell.  Several reviewers called A Lone Reply "among the very best" of tribal music, and "earns a place alongside essential works like Undercurrents in Dark Water (o yuki) and Soma (Roach and Rich)."

After his debut album as Surface 10, De Benedictis's music continued to grow more experimental and sentimental, and he began to diverge from the dance format of Cleopatra.  The label wanted more dance music, but De Benedictis was taking a different path.  De Benedictis left Cleopatra in 1999, and began recording on independent labels, including his own, at that time.

Fateless Records
The label was founded in 2001 De Benedictis. It specializes in electronic music, ambient music, and experimental music. It began with the release of "A Lone Reply".

Before 2011, De Benedictis was the only artist on the label. In April 2011, he announced the official relaunch of the Fateless Records and that he would, for the first time, begin carrying other artists on the label. The announcement was made on April 17, 2011, on KXLU in Los Angeles. Some of these artists are veteran recording artists, while others are debuting on this label.

Roster
 Dean De Benedictis
 Smite Matter
 Zygote
 Fulg3ncy
 Vic Hennegan

Discography
Full-length releases as Dean DeBenedictis
 A Lone Reply, Fateless, 2001.
 Salvaging the Past,  Spotted Pecarry, 2005
 A Cambient Variations, Fateless, 2008.

Full-length Releases as Surface 10
 Surface 10, Hypnotic/Cleopatra Records, 1996
 In Vitro Tide, DiN Records, 2000
 Borrowed Time, Space for Music, 2000
 Surface Tensions, DiN Records, 2006

Compilations featuring Surface 10 
 Space Box, Hypnotic/Cleopatra Records, 1996
 Ambient Time Travelers, Hypnotic/Cleopatra Records, 1996
 Tangerine Ambience, a tribute to Tangerine Dream, Hypnotic/Cleopatra Records, 1996
 A Tribute to the Music of Brian Eno, Hypnotic/Cleopatra Records, 1997
 Earth Ritual, Hypnotic/Cleopatra Records, 1997
 Hypnotic Illusions, Hypnotic/Cleopatra Records, 1997
 Ultimate Drum 'N' Bass, Hypnotic/Cleopatra Records, 1997
 Trancespotting, Hypnotic/Cleopatra Records, 1997
 Saturday Night Fetish, Hypnotic/Cleopatra Records, 1997
 The Carnival Within-A Tribute to Dead Can Dance, Hypnotic/Cleopatra Records, 1997
 Loraine, Peach, 1998
 DiN 10, DiN Records, 2001
 Novabeats Sound System Volume 1, Novabeats, 2004
 Fateless Flows Collective Volume 1, Fateless Flows, 2004
 You Wish You Heard It Yesterday-Volume 3, Android Folk, 2005
  Shadowmath: Fateless Flows Collective Volume 2, Fateless Flows, 2005
  Undergrounded: Fateless Flows Collective Volume 3, Fateless Flows, 2006

 Full length compilations 
 Exempli Gratia (as alias Cathexis, with George Sarah), Hypnotic/Cleopatra Records, 1997
 Solar Prominade (as alias Enterphase, with Jeff Filbert and Fred Becker), A.D., 2004

 Full-length releases with The Strato Ensemble 
 Drawn Straws, Fateless Records, 2007

References

External links
 Dean DeBenedictis Biography
 Echoes (PRI) interview, May 2006
 Fatelessmusic.com
 Cleopatra Records
 DiN Records website
 The Stratos Ensemble 

Ambient musicians
American male composers
21st-century American composers
Living people
Year of birth missing (living people)
21st-century American male musicians